Robert Brubaker is an American operatic tenor. Born in Manheim, Pennsylvania, he is an alumnus of the Hartt College of Music. Robert Brubaker began his professional career as a baritone chorister with the New York City Opera.  He left there 17 years later as a leading tenor, in La bohème as Rodolfo.

Life
Growing up on a farm in rural Pennsylvania, he heard his first opera, (a Metropolitan Opera Radio Broadcast of Aida) while working in the cow stable.  It's a long journey from there to actually setting foot on the stage of the Metropolitan Opera, which he has done many times since his debut as Zorn in Die Meistersinger in 1992, most notably as Mime in the Ring Cycle,(about which the New York Times said “The tenor Robert Brubaker triumphed as Mime.”),Chairman Mao in Nixon in China, Mefistofeles in Doktor Faust, Golitsin in Khovanschina and Gregor in The Makropoulos Case.  His “journey” has taken him to more than 50 different theaters worldwide, where he has sung over 120 roles in the opera repertory.

His first engagement in Europe came from Giancarlo Menotti, who brought a production of Zemlinsky's Der Zwerg from the Spoleto Festival, USA, to the Rome Opera. Even the sometimes ambivalent Roman audience was moved by his portrayal of the dwarf, an indication of the dramatic intensity he would bring to every role he inhabited. In 1995, Mr. Brubaker was invited to sing the role of Jimmy Mahoney in The Rise and Fall of the City of Mahagonny at the English National Opera. He was immediately asked back to sing Don Jose in Jonathan Miller’s new production of Carmen. Over the next several years he appeared at ENO in new productions and revivals, including  House of the Dead, Lady Macbeth of Mtsensk, Rusalka and the title role in Peter Grimes (becoming the first American to sing the role in England). He was introduced to Paris in 2000, in the role of Pierre Bezukhov in Francesca Zambello's production of War and Peace at the Opera National de Paris, followed by a reprise of Der Zwerg, Golitsin in Khovanscina (Opera News summed it up when writing about his Golitsin:  "Brubaker once again showed that, for sheer stamina in high-lying music, he has few rivals" ) and Dmitri in Boris Godunov.

Continuing his career in Europe, Mr. Brubaker appeared at the Salzburg Festival, singing the title role in Der König Kandaules, and  Alviano in Die Gezeichneten (“Robert Brubaker is a tour-de-force as Alviano using his light helden tenorvoice to convey the anguish he feels.” – Michael Sinclair, TheOpera Critic); Bacchus in Ariadne auf Naxos at the Royal Opera Covent Garden; Laca in Jenufa at the Glynebourne Festival.

He has sung at most of the major theaters in Italy and Spain:  Herod in Salome at La Scala, Bologna, Trieste and Barcelona (“Absolutely sensational [is] the Herodes of Robert Brubaker... At last a Herodes sung with [a] heroic voice.” – In Fernam Land, June 20, 2009); Hermann in Pique Dame in Naples;  Captain Vere in Billy Budd in Genoa;  Golitsin in Khovanschina in Florence and Barcelona; Sigmund in Die Walküre in Madrid; and in Seville, Mefistofeles in Doktor Faust and Loge in Das Rheingold.

Among the roles he has created, are the title role in Dominic Argento's The Dream of Valentino with the Washington Opera, and Don Ygnacio in Peter Eotvos's Of Love and Other Demons at the Glyndebourne festival. He has also had the opportunity to sing Peter Grimes in Aldeburgh, where Benjamin Britten wrote the opera, and Boris in Katya Kabanova at the Janáček Festival in Byrno.

Discography

On DVD:

Chairman Mao in Metropolitan Opera HD Live Production of Nixon In China, conducted by the composer, John Adams available on Nonesuch

Golitzin in Khovanshchina at the Gran Teatre del Liceu in Barcelona available on Opus Arte

Alviano Salvago in Franz Schreker’s Die Gezeichneten from the Salzburg Festival, directed by Nikolaus Lehnhoff and conducted by Kent Nagano available on Euro Arts.

Count Pierre Bezukhov in War and Peace with the Opéra National de Paris, directed by Francesca Zambello available on TDK

Rinuccio in Gianni Schicchi on VHS; Produced by the MET Opera Guild, (no longer commercially available)

On CD:

Franz Schreker, Die Gezeichneten– Alviano,  2010 Live recording at the Los Angeles Opera, James Conlon – conductor, Bridge Records  ( Soon to be released )

Zemlinsky, Der König Kandaules –Title Role,  2004 Salzburg Festival  – Berlin Philharmonic Orchestra, Kent Nagano – conductor

Leoš Janáček – Katya Kabanova –Boris Grigoryevich – 2006 Orchestra of Welsh National Opera, Carlo Rizzi – conductor, Chandos Records

Leoš Janáček – The MakropulosCase – Albert Gregor,English National Opera Orchestra – London Coliseum, Sir Charles Mackerras- conductor,Chandos Records

Herman Berlinski, Avodat Shabbat (Friday Evening Service )– Cantor, 2000 Berlin Radio Symphony Orchestra,Gerard Schwartz –  conductor, Naxos (Milken Archive of American Jewish Music)

Thomas Beveridge, Yiskor Requiem – Cantor, 2000 Academy of St. Martin in the Fields, Sir Neville Mariner – conductor, Naxos (Milken Archive of American Jewish Music)

Leonard Bernstein, Candide – The Man,  The Lion, New York City Opera Orchestra, John Mauceri – conductor

Soong Fu Yuan, The Bronx Arts Ensemble – 1996 The Little Fox;  Robert Sherman, Narrator; Arias and Duets from Return to Paradise,  Soong Fu Yuan – conductor

Sources
 Robert Brubaker at www.milkenarchive.org
  www.belcantoglobalarts.com
  RobertBrubaker.com

External links
 Official Website Robert Brubaker

Living people
American operatic tenors
University of Hartford Hartt School alumni
People from Manheim, Pennsylvania
Singers from Pennsylvania
Year of birth missing (living people)
Classical musicians from Pennsylvania